Prédio Basketball, better known as simply Prédio, is a Cape Verdean basketball team based in Praia on the Santiago Island. The team is part of the multi-sports club Predio, which was established on 22 December 1980. The team plays in the Associação Cabo Verdiana de Basquetebol (ACVB), 

Prédio will play in the 2022 qualifying tournament for the Basketball Africa League (BAL). Its roster features several players of the Cape Verde national team, such as Patrick Lima, Fidel Mendonca and Patrick Abreu.

Honours
Regional Champions of Santiago Sul
Champions: 2014

References

External links
Eurobasket.com Team profile

Basketball teams in Cape Verde